is a Japanese neurosurgeon, one of the  world authorities in the treatment of brain tumors.

He graduated from Tokyo University and is currently performing surgeries at WakeMed Raleigh and Duke University Hospital, North Carolina, USA.

References

External links
Raleigh Neurosurgical Clinic

1942 births
Living people
Japanese neurosurgeons